In molecular biology, 2'-5'-oligoadenylate synthetase (2-5A synthetase) is an enzyme that reacts to interferon signal. It is an antiviral enzyme that counteracts viral attack by degrading RNAs, both viral and host. The enzyme uses ATP in 2'-specific nucleotidyl transfer reactions to synthetize 2'-5'-oligoadenylates, which activate latent ribonuclease (RNASEL), resulting in degradation of viral RNA and inhibition of virus replication.

The C-terminal half of 2'-5'-oligoadenylate synthetase, also referred to as domain 2 of the enzyme, is largely alpha-helical and homologous to a tandem ubiquitin repeat. It carries the region of enzymatic activity between at the extreme C-terminal end.

Human proteins
 OAS1
 OAS2
 OAS3

See also
 OASL

References

Protein domains